ŽOK Rijeka is a  Croatian women's volleyball club based in Rijeka. It was established in 1947. It plays in the  Croatian 1A Volleyball League, and in recent years it has competed in the Women's CEV Champions League. They have won seven straight Croatian League titles since 2006, and the Middle European League in 2009.

Honours

Domestic competitions
Croatian League 
 Winners (10): 1998–99, 1999–2000, 2000–01, 2006–07, 2007–08, 2008–09, 2009–10, 2010–11, 2011–12, 2012–13
 Runners-up (5): 1992–93, 1993–94, 1995–96, 1996–97, 2005–06
Croatian Cup
 Winners (10): 1992, 1998, 1999, 2000, 2005, 2006, 2007, 2008, 2009, 2012
 Runners-up (7): 1993, 1994, 1995, 1996, 1997, 2010, 2011
Yugoslav League
 Winners (2): 1972–73, 1973–74
 Runners-up (2): 1974–75, 1975–76
Yugoslav Cup
 Winners (4): 1973, 1975, 1977, 1978

International competitions
Middle European Cup
 Winners (1): 2008–09

External links
ŽOK Rijeka official website 
CEV profile

Croatian volleyball clubs
Volleyball clubs established in 1947
Rijeka
1947 establishments in Croatia